Let It Roll is the second studio album by American country music group Midland. It was released on August 23, 2019 via Big Machine Records.

Content
Midland released the album's lead single "Mr. Lonely" in February 2019. As with their previous album On the Rocks, the project was produced by Dann Huff, Shane McAnally, and Josh Osborne. In support of the album, the band began the Let It Roll Tour in June 2019.

Critical reception

The album received a Metacritic rating of 74 based on 5 critics, indicating generally favorable reviews.

Stephen Thomas Erlewine of AllMusic rated the album 3.5 out of 5 stars, stating that " It's a record that gets by on feel, not songs, which may mean that it doesn't provide many distinguishing hooks, but it does sound awfully good as it plays." Also rating it 3.5 out of 5 stars, Jon Freeman of Rolling Stone called the album "immaculately disheveled" and noted influences of non-country artists, which he described as "a statement that the group’s fluid musical identity is a feature, not a bug."

Commercial performance

Let It Roll  debuted at No. 1 on Billboard Top Country Albums with 22,000 units, 16,000 of which are traditional album sales.  This is Midland's first number one on the chart.  On Billboard 200, the album debuted at No. 16. The album has sold 41,300 copies in the United States as of March 2020.

Track listing

Personnel
From Let It Roll notes.

Midland
Jess Carson - background vocals (all tracks except 14), lead vocals (14), acoustic guitar (all tracks), electric guitar (8)
Cameron Duddy - background vocals (all tracks except 12), lead vocals (12), bass guitar (all tracks)
Mark Wystrach - lead vocals (all tracks except 12 & 14), background vocals (12, 14), acoustic guitar (8)

Additional musicians
Dave Cohen - piano (12, 13), Hammond B-3 organ (14), Rhodes piano (6, 12), accordion (10)
Robbie Crowell - piano (7, 10), Hammond B-3 organ (3, 5, 6, 8, 12, 13), Wurlitzer electric piano (4), Mellotron (14), Rhodes piano (8), synthesizer (9), saxophone (12), drums (1, 2, 7-9), percussion (11), tambourine (1)
Luke Cutchen - electric guitar (all tracks except 4 & 11)
Paul Franklin - steel guitar (all tracks)
Dann Huff - electric guitar (1, 2, 4-6, 9, 11, 12) acoustic guitar (2, 3), gut string guitar (5), 12-string guitar (4), slide guitar (1), mandolin (2, 4), Solina (4), bouzouki (11), sitar (1), Hammond B-3 organ (1), synthesizer (6), programming (3, 4, 8, 10), percussion (11), shaker (1)
David Huff - programming (1-6, 8-12)
Laur Joamets - electric guitar (1, 2, 4, 8, 9, 11), acoustic guitar (2, 9), high strung guitar (9), acoustic slide guitar (7)
Charlie Judge - piano (3), Hammond B-3 organ (4), Wurlitzer electric piano (11), keyboards (5)
Rob McNelley - electric guitar (3-5, 11)
Greg Morrow - drums (3-5, 11)
Gordon Mote - piano (9), Hammond B-3 organ (9)
Jerry Roe - drums (6, 10, 12-14), congas (12), tambourine (6)
Derek Wells - electric guitar (6, 10, 12, 13)

Technical
Adam Ayan - mastering
Cameron Duddy - art direction
Mike "Frog" Griffith - production coordination
Joseph Holguin - recording assistant (1, 3-7, 8, 10-14)
Dann Huff - producer
David Huff - digital editing
Steve Marcantonio - recording (all tracks except 8)
Shane McAnally - producer
Seth Morton - recording (all tracks except 8)
Britt Murray - recording (9)
Justin Niebank - mixing
Josh Osborne - producer
Jordan Reed - recording assistant (1, 2, 4, 5, 7, 9, 11)
Jacob Sciba - recording (8)
Chris Small - digital editing
Harper Smith - photography

Charts

Weekly charts

Year-end charts

References

Midland (band) albums
2019 albums
Big Machine Records albums
Albums produced by Dann Huff
Albums produced by Shane McAnally